The Reverend Father James Kelsey McConica, OC, FBA, FRHistS, FRSC (born 1930) is a Canadian Roman Catholic priest (Congregation of St. Basil), academic, and academic administrator. He was President and Vice-Chancellor of the University of St. Michael's College, Toronto from 1984 to 1990 and President of the Pontifical Institute of Mediaeval Studies from 1996 to 2008. He is also a fellow of All Souls College, Oxford, the first Roman Catholic priest to be a fellow since the English Reformation.

References 

 https://www.gg.ca/en/honours/recipients/146-6622
 https://www.asc.ox.ac.uk/person/revd-dr-james-mcconica
 https://ourspace.uregina.ca/bitstream/handle/10294/3068/Third_Degree_2006-Spring.pdf?sequence=1&isAllowed=y

1930 births
Officers of the Order of Canada
Corresponding Fellows of the British Academy
Fellows of the Royal Historical Society
Fellows of the Royal Society of Canada
Congregation of St. Basil
Academic staff of the University of Toronto
Fellows of All Souls College, Oxford
Academic staff of the University of Saskatchewan
Academic staff of York University
Intellectual historians
Canadian medievalists
20th-century Canadian historians
21st-century Canadian historians
Canadian academic administrators
Canadian university and college chief executives
Canadian Rhodes Scholars
Alumni of the University of Oxford
Princeton University alumni
University of Toronto alumni
Living people